Mount Frederick William is a mountain located at the Queen Reach arm of the Jervis Inlet within the Pacific Ranges of the Coast Mountains in British Columbia Canada.

This mountain has been given the nickname of Frankenstein for it has the familiar profile of the famous monster's face.

External links
      
CM_C2308 Fraser River to N.E.Pt. of Texada Island including Howe Sound and Jervis Inlet 'Annotated'  1863.02.16 1865.08

Gallery

References

Frederick William
Frederick William
New Westminster Land District
Frederick III, German Emperor